Argyrodiaptomus is a genus of copepods in the family Diaptomidae, containing the following species:

Argyrodiaptomus aculeatus (Douwe, 1911)
Argyrodiaptomus argentinus (S. Wright, 1938)
Argyrodiaptomus azevedoi (S. Wright, 1935)
Argyrodiaptomus bergi (Richard, 1897)
Argyrodiaptomus denticulatus (Pesta, 1927)
Argyrodiaptomus exilis Dussart, 1985
Argyrodiaptomus falcifer (Daday, 1905)
Argyrodiaptomus furcatus (G. O. Sars, 1901)
Argyrodiaptomus granulosus Brehm, 1933
Argyrodiaptomus macrochaetus Brehm, 1937
Argyrodiaptomus neglectus (S. Wright, 1937)
Argyrodiaptomus nhumirim Reid, 1997
Argyrodiaptomus paggi Previattelli & Santos-Silva, 2007
Argyrodiaptomus robertsonae Dussart, 1985
Argyrodiaptomus spiniger (Brehm, 1925)

References

Diaptomidae
Taxonomy articles created by Polbot